Delyan or Delian  (also Romanized as Delyān and Daliyān) is a village in Pachehlak-e Gharbi Rural District, in the Central District of Azna County, Lorestan Province, Iran. At the 2006 census, its population was 31, in 5 families.  It lies several kilometres to the northeast of Azna.

References 

Towns and villages in Azna County